The Comfort of Saturdays is the fifth book in The Sunday Philosophy Club Series by Alexander McCall Smith. It was published in the U.S. as The Comforts of a Muddy Saturday.

Plot
A chance conversation draws Isabel Dalhousie into the case of a doctor, believed by his wife to have been unfairly disgraced in an affair of a dangerous drug.

Her niece, Cat, is on holiday, leaving Isabel to run the delicatessen and attempt to get closer to, and possibly help, Cat's assistant, Eddie, whom she believes to have been damaged by something in his past.

Somewhat to Isabel's disquiet, her fiancé, Jamie, strikes up a friendship with an arrogant American composer.

References

2008 British novels
Novels by Alexander McCall Smith
Novels set in Edinburgh
Little, Brown and Company books